2nd Mokva or Vtoraya Mokva is a rural locality in Mokovsky Selsoviet Rural Settlement, Kursky District, Kursk Oblast, Russia. Population:

Geography 
The village is located on the Seym River (a left tributary of the Desna) and its right tributary, Mokva, 84 km from the Russia–Ukraine border, 3 km (13 km of it by road) southwest of Kursk, at the southern border of the selsoviet center – 1st Mokva.

 Streets
There are the following streets in the village: Kashtanovaya, Lazurnaya, Mostovaya, Pionerskaya, Raduzhnaya, Rechnaya, Yasenevaya, Yasnaya and Zvyozdnaya (112 houses).

 Climate
2nd Mokva has a warm-summer humid continental climate (Dfb in the Köppen climate classification).

Transport 
2nd Mokva is located on the federal route  Crimea Highway (a part of the European route ), 5 km from the nearest railway station Ryshkovo (railway line Lgov I — Kursk).

The rural locality is situated 15 km from Kursk Vostochny Airport, 121 km from Belgorod International Airport and 218 km from Voronezh Peter the Great Airport.

References

Notes

External links 
 2nd Mokva on komandirovka.ru

Sources

Rural localities in Kursky District, Kursk Oblast